The Retrieval of Ethics is a 2009 book by Talbot Brewer in which the author tries to re-examine the history of ethics from ancient Greek philosophy to the present and “retrieve” the strengths of the Ancients in order to provide a radical reconception of moral philosophy and its role in life.

Reception
Brewer's ideas have been criticized by different scholars including Lorraine Besser-Jones, Bradford Cokelet, Christopher Cordner, Mark LeBar and Tamar Schapiro.

References

External links 
 The Retrieval of Ethics

2009 non-fiction books
Oxford University Press books
English-language books
Ethics books